Jörgen Ragnarsson (born 19 May 1954) is a former Swedish sailor who competed in the 1980 Summer Olympics, where he won a bronze medal in the Tornado class together with Göran Marström.

References

Swedish male sailors (sport)
Sailors at the 1980 Summer Olympics – Tornado
Olympic sailors of Sweden
Olympic bronze medalists for Sweden
Olympic medalists in sailing
1954 births
Living people
Linköpings Jolleseglarklubb sailors
Medalists at the 1980 Summer Olympics